Olha Iakovenko (born 1 June 1987, in Vinnytsia) is a Ukrainian race walker. She competed in the 20 km kilometres event at the 2012 Summer Olympics.

References

Sportspeople from Vinnytsia
Ukrainian female racewalkers
1987 births
Living people
Olympic athletes of Ukraine
Athletes (track and field) at the 2012 Summer Olympics